The Elisha Southwick House is an historic house located at 255 Chocolog Road, in Uxbridge, Massachusetts, United States.  The house is named for Elisha Southwick, a tanner and shoe manufacturer. David L. Southwick, who owned the house in the later decades of the 19th century, was a blacksmith who lived in the house in the late 1800s and built Conestoga wagon wheels.

The house is a -story wood-frame Cape style house, five bays wide, with a side-gable roof, central chimney, clapboard siding, and granite foundation.  Its main facade is symmetrical, with a center entrance flanked by pilasters and topped by a transom window.  The windows in the side bays are butted against the cornice in the Federal style.  Probably built in the 1820s, it is a well-preserved example of vernacular Federal period architecture.

On October 7, 1983, it was added to the National Register of Historic Places.

See also
National Register of Historic Places listings in Uxbridge, Massachusetts

References

External links
 Elisha Southwick House MACRIS Listing

Houses in Uxbridge, Massachusetts
National Register of Historic Places in Uxbridge, Massachusetts
Houses on the National Register of Historic Places in Worcester County, Massachusetts